Dauber (1935–1947) was an American Thoroughbred racehorse best known for winning the 1938 Preakness Stakes. Bred by Sonny Whitney, he was sired by Harry Payne Whitney's 1913 Futurity Stakes winner, Pennant. His dam was Ship of War, a daughter of Man o' War.

Dauber was purchased by William du Pont, Jr. and raced by his Foxcatcher Farms. Under trainer Richard Handlen, his best result in a major race for two-year-olds was a win in the 1937 Nursery Handicap and a third in the 1937 Pimlico Futurity. At age three, he notably earned a second-place finish to Stagehand in the 1938 Santa Anita Derby. He went on to compete in all three of the U.S. Triple Crown races. Ridden by jockey Maurice Peters, Dauber finished second to  Lawrin in the Kentucky Derby, won the Preakness Stakes by seven lengths, and was second to Pasteurized in the Belmont Stakes. Following the Triple Crown, Dauber did not win another significant race.

Retired to stud, Dauber was not successful as a sire.

Breeding

References

 Dauber's pedigree and partial racing stats

1935 racehorse births
1947 racehorse deaths
Racehorses bred in Kentucky
Racehorses trained in the United States
Du Pont racehorses
Preakness Stakes winners
Thoroughbred family 12-b